The Bajaj Qute, earlier called Bajaj RE60, is a rear-engine, rear-wheel-drive, four-passenger quadricycle built by the Indian company Bajaj Auto and is aimed primarily at the Indian domestic market. The car was the first four-wheeler manufactured by Bajaj Auto, which was unveiled on 3 January 2012. In India, the Qute is not legally classified as a car.

On 22 May 2013, the Government of India legally classified it as a quadricycle. It is unable to reach speeds of 90 km/h and is therefore only allowed to be used for commercial purposes to replace auto rickshaws.

History 
In 2010, Bajaj Auto announced the cooperation with Renault and Nissan Motor to develop a  car, aiming at a fuel-efficiency of  (3.3 L/100 km), or twice an average small car, and carbon dioxide emissions of 100 g/km.

Bajaj Auto first unveiled the Bajaj Qute as the RE60 on 3 January 2012, at the 2012 Auto Expo in Delhi. Bajaj Auto was best known for scooters and three-wheel auto-rickshaws, and is India's second-largest two-wheeled vehicle maker and is a world leader in three-wheeled vehicles. The Qute is Bajaj's first foray into the four-wheel market.

With a fare meter included in the base model's dashboard, the firm is targeting auto-rickshaw drivers by offering a four wheeler as economical to run as a three-wheeler, but safer and more comfortable.

Technical specifications 
The four wheeler has a metal-polymer monocoque body due to which it weighs .

Safety 
The Qute in its standard European configuration received 1 star in the Euro NCAP Quadricycle Ratings in 2016.

Plan 

Bajaj Auto plans to roll out 5,000 units/month of its much-delayed four-seater "quadricycle" Qute from its Aurangabad Plant and it is to be priced between ₹1.25 lakh and ₹2.5 lakh. The Ministry of Road Transport and Highways has decided to allow operation of quadricycles as passenger vehicles, besides commercial use. They have allowed 16-year-olds to drive only quadricycles.

In 2019, Qute finally got all approvals for Indian roads after six years of legal fights and regulatory impediments. The governments of 22 states have approved it and already plying on the roads of six of those states: Kerala, Gujarat, Rajasthan, Uttar Pradesh, Odisha, and Maharashtra.

In popular culture 
A Bajaj Qute appears in the 2022 American romantic comedy film The Lost City, where it is used by the main characters before being destroyed.

References

External links 

 Official Bajaj Qute site

Microcars
Quadricycles
Euro NCAP 4 seat heavy quadricycle
Bajaj Auto
2010s cars
Cars introduced in 2012
Rear-engined vehicles